Konstantin Stefanov Dimitrov (born 28 January 1957 in Sofia) is a Bulgarian politician and a Member of the European Parliament (MEP) until 2007. Dimitrov is a member of the Democrats for a Strong Bulgaria party, part of the European People's Party–European Democrats, and became an MEP on 1 January 2007 with the accession of Bulgaria to the European Union.

In January 2013 under the leadership of Dimitrov, the Embassy of Bulgaria was the first embassy in the UK to be awarded the Grassroot Diplomat Initiative Honouree its contributions to the Bulgarian School based at the embassy.

References

External links 
 European Parliament profile
 Embassy of Bulgaria, Grassroot Diplomat

1957 births
Living people
Democrats for a Strong Bulgaria MEPs
MEPs for Bulgaria 2007